Judith Jasmin (July 10, 1916 – October 20, 1972) was a journalist from Quebec. Born in Terrebonne, Quebec, Canada, she was the first woman from Quebec to become a grand reporter (special correspondent).

Jasmin's journalistic career began at Radio-Canada's world service at the end of the 1940s.  It was there she met future Quebec premier René Lévesque with whom she would go on to co-host the radio program Carrefour.  In 1953, Jasmin entered Radio-Canada's television news service where she made a name for herself with such programs as Reportages and Conférence de presse.  All the while, Jasmin continued to take to the streets, listening to the people in order to denounce injustices.  She was a founding member of the Mouvement laïque de langue française ("The Francophone Secular Movement").

She spent the next few years of her life abroad, meeting seminal figures of the time and sharing her experiences with the Quebec public.  Despite the many obstacles she faced throughout the course of her career, Jasmin's talent and determination allowed her to join the ranks of the great Quebec journalists.

In 1966, Radio-Canada named Jasmin their United Nations correspondent and, later, their Washington correspondent.

After being diagnosed with cancer, she returned to Montreal in 1970 where, despite her illness, she continued to report on public affairs.

She died in Montreal in 1972.

External links
 Le prix Judith-Jasmin - Trente ans de journalisme de talent (The Judith Jasmin Prize: Thirty years of journalistic excellence)

1916 births
1972 deaths
Canadian women radio journalists
Deaths from cancer in Quebec
Journalists from Quebec
People from Terrebonne, Quebec
Writers from Quebec
Canadian non-fiction writers in French
Canadian women non-fiction writers
20th-century Canadian women writers
20th-century Canadian non-fiction writers